The Great Midwest Conference was an NCAA Division I athletics conference that existed from 1991 to 1995.

History
It was formed in 1990 with six members: Cincinnati and Memphis State (now Memphis) from the Metro Conference, UAB from the Sun Belt Conference, Marquette and Saint Louis from the Midwestern Collegiate Conference (now the Horizon League), and independent DePaul. Dayton joined in 1993. Cleveland State and Detroit-Mercy had some interest from coaches, while Louisville and Tulane were heavily favored by athletic directors.

In 1995, six of the schools in the Great Midwest (except for Dayton, who joined the Atlantic 10 Conference) joined with UNC Charlotte, Louisville, Southern Mississippi, Tulane, and South Florida of the Metro and Houston of the dissolving Southwest Conference and formed Conference USA.

Chronological timeline
 1990 - The Great Midwest Conference was founded. Charter members included the University of Cincinnati and Memphis State University (now the University of Memphis) from the Metro Conference, the University of Alabama at Birmingham (UAB) from the Sun Belt Conference, Marquette University and Saint Louis University from the Midwestern Collegiate Conference (now the Horizon League), and D-I Independent DePaul University, effective beginning the 1990-91 academic year.
 1993 - University of Dayton joined the Great Midwest, effective in the 1993-94 academic year.
 1995 - The Great Midwest ceased operations as an athletic conference, effective after the 1994-95 academic year; as many schools left to join their respective new home primary conferences, effective beginning the 1995-96 academic year: Cincinnati, DePaul, Marquette, Memphis, Saint Louis and UAB joined with the Metro Conference schools to form Conference USA, while Dayton joined the Atlantic 10 Conference (A-10).

Member schools

Final members

Notes
 Dayton and Saint Louis are in the Atlantic 10 Conference
 Following the July 2013 split of the original Big East Conference into two leagues, DePaul and Marquette moved to the new, non-football conference that retained the Big East name, while Cincinnati remained in the football-sponsoring former conference, now named the American Athletic Conference.
 At the time of the Big East split, Memphis moved from C-USA to The American.

Membership timeline

Championships

The following were the locations of the GMC men's basketball tournament.

1992: Chicago Stadium; Chicago, Illinois
1993: The Pyramid; Memphis, Tennessee
1994: Shoemaker Center; Cincinnati, Ohio
1995: Bradley Center; Milwaukee, Wisconsin

See also
Great Midwest Conference Men's Basketball Player of the Year

References

 
Sports organizations established in 1991
Organizations disestablished in 1995
1991 establishments in the United States